The Eisvogel class icebreakers (Type 721) was a two ship class built for the German Navy by the Hitzler Werft shipyard of Lauenburg/Elbe.

The Eisvogel was in service for the Naval Base Command Kiel and sold to private owners after decommissioning. Since 2010 she is operated as a civil tugboat in Trieste.

The Eisbär was based along the German North Sea coast. After decommissioning she was laid up in Wilhelmshaven later sold to the Netherlands.

List of Ships

The ships are named after the European kingfisher (Eisvogel) and polar bear (Eisbär), both names contain the German word for ice.

See also
 Icebreaker Eisvogel—an unrelated vessel
Eisvogel (1942 icebreaker)

References

External links
 Special Vessels - Hitzler Werft's webpage about special ships built by them, including the Eisvogel class

Further reading 
 Gerhard Koop/Siegfried Breyer: Die Schiffe, Fahrzeuge und Flugzeuge der deutschen Marine von 1956 bis heute, Bernard & Graefe Verlag, Bonn 1996,  (German)

Auxiliary icebreaker classes
Icebreakers of Germany
Auxiliary ships of the German Navy